Malanda  is a rural town and locality in the Tablelands Region, Queensland, Australia. The economy is based upon agriculture (particularly dairy) and tourism.

Geography 
The town is located downstream of the Malanda Falls on the North Johnstone River.

The northern entrance to the town passes the Malanda Falls. In comparison to the gorges of the escarpment the falls were created by the last flow of lava from the Malanda Shield Volcano with a cascade of roughly 4 metres. The town's unofficial swimming pool lies at the bottom of the falls, as there is an established pool located near the primary school. The name 'Malanda', according to some sources, was the local Aboriginal word meaning 'waterfalls'.

History
Malanda formed part of Ngajanji territory.

The name Malanda comes from Malanda Creek, and is believed to be an Aboriginal name for the Upper Johnstone River, with the suggested meaning little stream with big stones or running rivers.

Malanda first developed in the 1900s after the discovery of tin and copper at Herberton saw a steady stream of miners and engineers moving over the mountains from the coast.

In 1886, a decision was made to build a railway coming into the area but the problems of construction outweighed its use. Over  of railway was installed into the region in the next six years. By 1890 the Tablelands railway line had reached Kuranda. It pushed on to Mareeba in 1893 and Atherton in 1903 and did not reach Malanda until 1911. The line closed in 1964.

In 1908, James English (later the publican of the Malanda Hotel and father of Charles English) and James Emerson both moved into the area. Both saw the district's dairy potential. English brought cattle from Kiama and the Richmond River areas in New South Wales and Emerson had a herd of 1,026 cattle overlanded from Lismore. They took 16 months to reach Malanda and only 560 survived the journey. Despite this arduous start the industry grew and by 1919 Malanda had its own butter factory. In 1973 this amalgamated with the factory in Millaa Millaa to form the Atherton Tablelands Co-operative Dairy Association.

In 1910, in response to a developing local industry, John Prince established a sawmill in Malanda. It was from this mill that the boards for the Malanda Hotel (built in 1911) were sawn.

Malanda Post Office opened by January 1912 (a receiving office had been open from 1911).

The Malanda parish of the Roman Catholic Diocese of Cairns was established in 1959.

Malanda State School opened on 4 August 1913. From 1949 until 1961, it also offered secondary education, until Malanda State High School opened on 23 January 1961.

The first Malanda Show took place on 6–7 September 1916 on land belonging to James English, with 1000 people attending the show on the second day.

The Malanda Library and Customer Service Centre building opened in 1990.

At the  Malanda had a population of 1,009 people.

At the  Malanda had a population of 2,052 people.

Heritage listings

Malanda has a number of heritage-listed sites, including:
 1 Eacham Place: Majestic Picture Theatre
 Malanda Falls Park: Malanda Falls Swimming Pool
 Monash Ave: St James Catholic Church

Economy 
The name Malanda is synonymous throughout North Queensland with milk and cheese.  Local promoters, noting that Malanda milk is sold in the Northern Territory and as far north as Weipa, declared Malanda to be 'the headquarters for one of the largest and longest milk runs in the world'. The milk is also exported to Indonesia and Malaysia. Malanda Milk is now a part of Dairy Farmers, but with a shorter milk run, only as far south as Mackay and as far north as Darwin.

Education
Malanda State School is a government primary (Prep-6) school for boys and girls at 24 Mary Street. In 2017, the school had an enrolment of 351 students with 23 teachers (21 full-time equivalent) and 17 non-teaching staff (11 full-time equivalent). In 2018, the school had an enrolment of 380 students with 26 teachers (24 full-time equivalent) and 18 non-teaching staff (12 full-time equivalent). It includes a special education program.

Malanda State High School is a government secondary (7-12) school for boys and girls at Memorial Drive. In 2017, the school had an enrolment of 368 students with 34 teachers (33 full-time equivalent) and 25 non-teaching staff (18 full-time equivalent). In 2018, the school had an enrolment of 418 students with 38 teachers (37 full-time equivalent) and 29 non-teaching staff (20 full-time equivalent). It includes a special education program.

Amenities 
Tablelands Regional Council operates the Malanda Library at 31 James Street, Malanda. It is open Tuesday to Saturday.

The Malanda branch of the Queensland Country Women's Association meets at the QCWA Hall at 3 Elizabeth Street.

St James' Catholic Church is at 7 Monash Avenue. It is within the Malanda Parish of the Roman Catholic Diocese of Cairns.

Attractions 
The Malanda Falls Conservation Park is just opposite the Malanda Falls. It offers a short walk through the rainforest and an opportunity to see a wide range of rainforest trees.

Today the solitary pub is the only reminder of a once-thriving town which was surveyed in 1907. The publican has a collection of antique telephones. The hotel suffered some serious damage from Cyclone Larry in March 2006.

The Malanda Art Trail starts at the town library. Nine vibrant artworks commemorate the rich history of Malanda's community – the Original Inhabitants, Hardships and Struggles, Transport, Commerce, Recollections, Early Settlers, the Dairy Industry, Recreation and Looking Ahead. Close study of the individual mosaics (each of which contains a blue butterfly) reveals many details camouflaged in the intricate designs, and the handmade ceramic border tiles tell more about the theme of the central mosaic. Mosaics were made by former resident Felicity Wallis.

It is possible to swim with platypus at the base of Malanda Falls. The North Johnstone River is free of crocodiles.

Tree-kangaroos have been seen crossing the road over the top of Malanda Falls.The Majestic Theatre is said to be the oldest continually-operating cinema in Australia and has potato-sack seating on 14 December 1929 it was dedicated by Fred Browning, Superintendent of the Atherton Ambulance centre. Mr. Browning produced, stage managed and performed in the opening concert.

The Malanda Hotel has a grand ballroom and staircase and is claimed to be the largest wooden structure in Australia.

The Historical Resource Centre in Elizabeth Street is the meeting room and archival repository for all printed and photographic collections of the Eacham Historical Society. It houses a comprehensive library of books pertaining to the history of North Queensland. These books are available for perusal and study at the centre by students and members of the general public. Books can be borrowed by members of the society. The Land Settlement Registers, which contain the names of all the first settlers in the Atherton Land Agent's District, are available for perusal and research. The handwritten registers contain a wealth of information about the early settlement of the Atherton tablelands. The Resource Centre is open Tuesday evenings 7.30 pm to 9.30 pm, and Thursday mornings, 9.00 am to noon.

Notable residents
 Charles English, Member of the Queensland Legislative Assembly
 Jack Mundey, trade unionist and conservationist
 Shane Stefanutto, former professional football player for the Brisbane Roar and North Queensland Fury.

References

External links

 
 Town map of Malanda, 1974
 Destination Malanda
 The Eacham Historical Society

 
Towns in Queensland
Populated places in Far North Queensland
Tablelands Region
Localities in Queensland